The NCAA Division III Men's Lacrosse Championship is the annual championship in men's lacrosse held by the NCAA for teams competing in Division III.

After the inauguration of the NCAA Division I championship in 1971, the USILA added a "small college" tournament for two years for all non-Division I schools. Hobart defeated Washington College 15-12 to win the 1972 USILA title. And Cortland State beat Washington College to win the 1973 title, 13-8.

The NCAA conducted a combined Division II and III tournament for the 1974 through 1979 seasons, followed by separate tournaments for Division II and Division III beginning in 1980.

Champions

Team championship records

 Schools highlight in yellow have reclassified athletics from NCAA Division III.

Finals appearances by state

See also
NCAA Men's Lacrosse Championships (Division I, Division II)
NCAA Women's Lacrosse Championships (Division I, Division II, Division III)
NAIA Men's Lacrosse Invitational
United States Intercollegiate Lacrosse Association
Wingate Memorial Trophy
North–South Senior All-Star Game
Pre-NCAA Lacrosse Champion

References

External links
Division III men's lacrosse